Giampaolo Morelli (born 25 November 1974 in Naples) is an Italian actor, director, and screenwriter.  He is particularly known for his television work; among his roles is as the title character in the L'ispettore Coliandro series.

Filmography

Films

Television

Music videos

References
Article about Morelli

1974 births
Living people
Italian screenwriters
Italian male screenwriters
Italian film directors
Film people from Naples
Male actors from Naples